Roman Codreanu (17 November 1952 – 26 May 2001) was a super-heavyweight Greco-Roman wrestler from Romania. He won the European title in 1978, as well as bronze medals at the 1976 Olympics and 1975 and 1978 world championships. He spent his entire career with the club Vagonul Arad, and later worked there as a coach.

References

1952 births
2001 deaths
Olympic wrestlers of Romania
Wrestlers at the 1976 Summer Olympics
Wrestlers at the 1980 Summer Olympics
Romanian male sport wrestlers
Olympic bronze medalists for Romania
Olympic medalists in wrestling
Medalists at the 1976 Summer Olympics
European Wrestling Championships medalists
World Wrestling Championships medalists
People from Hunedoara County
20th-century Romanian people
21st-century Romanian people